Edward Francis Gordon (November 18, 1928–October 16, 2013) was an American politician who served in the Kansas House of Representatives and Kansas State Senate.

Gordon was born in Highland, Kansas, where he married his wife, Virginia, in 1948; they spent most of their lives in the town and were married for 65 years. He was appointed to the Kansas House of Representatives in 1975, to fill out the remainder of the term for a seat left vacant by the resignation of George Van Bebber.

Gordon served in the Kansas House until 1982, when the death of John E. Chandler left the 1st senate district open. Gordon was appointed to that seat and won re-election in his own right in 1984. He was succeeded in the Senate by Don Sallee.

References

1928 births
2013 deaths
Republican Party Kansas state senators
Republican Party members of the Kansas House of Representatives
20th-century American politicians
People from Doniphan County, Kansas